Gành Hào is a township and capital of Đông Hải District, Bạc Liêu Province, in south-western Vietnam.

References

Populated places in Bạc Liêu province
Communes of Bạc Liêu province
District capitals in Vietnam
Townships in Vietnam